Chillingham is a small village approximately 14 km northwest of Murwillumbah in the Tweed Valley, New South Wales, Australia. The Rous River, a tributary of the Tweed River, flows through the town.

Chillingham Post Office opened on 28 May 1923. A Telegraph Office had been open since 1913, known for some months as Bean Tree.

References

External links
Tweed Tourism Inc - visitor information for the Tweed region (including Chillingham)

Suburbs of Tweed Heads, New South Wales